The Herreria Formation is a geologic formation in northeastern Guatemala. It preserves fossils dating back to the Miocene period.

Fossil content 
 Rhynchotherium blicki

See also 
 List of fossiliferous stratigraphic units in Guatemala

References

Further reading 
 S. G. Lucas and G. E. Alvarado. 1995. El proboscideo Rhynchotherium blicki (Mioceno tardio) del oriente de Guatemala. Title translated: The proboscidean Rhynchotherium blicki (upper Miocene) from eastern Guatemala. Revista Geologica de America Central 18:19-24

Geology of Guatemala
Neogene Guatemala